Tradescantia spathacea, the oyster plant, boatlily or Moses-in-the-cradle, is a herb  in the Commelinaceae family first described in 1788. It is native to Belize, Guatemala, and southern Mexico (Chiapas, Tabasco, and the Yucatán Peninsula) but widely cultivated as an ornamental and naturalized in parts of Florida, Texas, Hawaii, and various oceanic islands.

Description 
Tradescantia spathacea has fleshy rhizomes and rosettes of waxy lance-shaped leaves. Leaves are dark to metallic green above, with glossy purple underneath. They are hardy in USDA zones 9-12 and are also grown as ornamental houseplants. Its cultivar 'Sitara' has gained the Royal Horticultural Society's Award of Garden Merit.

Invasiveness 
Tradescantia spathacea has naturalized in Florida and Louisiana and is listed as a Category II invasive exotic species by the Florida Exotic Pest Plant Council. "This means Invasive exotics that have increased in abundance or frequency but have not yet altered Florida plant communities to the extent shown by Category I species. These species may become ranked Category I if ecological damage is demonstrated."

References

spathacea
Flora of Mexico
Flora of Central America
Plants described in 1788
House plants
Garden plants
Taxa named by Olof Swartz